Pseudosilvanus distinctus is a species of beetle in the family Silvanidae, the only species in the genus Pseudosilvanus.

References

Silvanidae genera
Monotypic Cucujoidea genera